Firestone Tire and Rubber Company is an American tire company founded by Harvey Firestone (1868–1938) in 1900 initially to supply solid rubber side-wire tires for fire apparatus, and later, pneumatic tires for wagons, buggies, and other forms of wheeled transportation common in the era.  Firestone soon saw the huge potential for marketing tires for automobiles, and the company was a pioneer in the mass production of tires. Harvey Firestone had a personal friendship with Henry Ford, and used this to become the original equipment supplier of Ford Motor Company automobiles, and was also active in the replacement market.

In 1988, the company was sold to the Japanese Bridgestone Corporation.

History

Early-to-mid-20th century

Firestone was originally based in Akron, Ohio, also the hometown of its archrival, Goodyear, and two other midsized competitors, General Tire and Rubber and BFGoodrich. Founded on August 3, 1900, the company initiated operations with 12 employees. Together, Firestone and Goodyear were the largest suppliers of automotive tires in North America for over 75 years. In 1906, Henry Ford chose Firestone to supply tires for its car models.

In 1918, Firestone Tire and Rubber Company of Canada was incorporated in Hamilton, Ontario, and the first Canadian-made tire rolled off the line on September 15, 1922. During the 1920s, Firestone produced the Oldfield tire, named for racing driver Barney Oldfield.

That year the company also opened its first Firestone Tire and Service Center (later renamed Firestone Complete Auto Care). Firestone Complete Auto Care is the division of Firestone that offers automotive maintenance and repair, including tires.

In 1927, Henry Ford and Harvey Firestone visited southern California to select locations for new factories. His friends said Ford wanted to be near the ocean and picked Long Beach and suggested Firestone locate in South Gate, California a small community southeast of downtown Los Angeles that at the time was mostly farmland. There Firestone identified  of beanfields for the site of his new manufacturing plant. Architects Curlett and Beelman designed a spectacular four-story Italianate-style complex, with its own power plant and decorated with polychrome murals by Gladding, McBean depicting the tire and rubber-making process. The town grew around Firestone, its main boulevard was named after Harvey, and Los Angeles became the number one tire market in the country. By the mid-1970s, Ford and GM had massive layoffs as Firestone and other manufacturers opened new plants in non-union locales like Wilson, North Carolina. After considerable downsizing, the South Gate plant was closed in 1980 and 1,300 workers were laid off. East Los Angeles College has proposed a new satellite campus at the site.

In 1928, the company built a factory in Brentford, England, a longtime Art Deco landmark on a major route into the city; this closed in 1979. After its purchase by Trafalgar House, the building was demolished during the August 1980 bank holiday weekend, reportedly in anticipation of its becoming listed.

In 1936, the company opened a plant in Memphis, Tennessee. With a work force exceeding 3,000 employees, the Memphis plant was the largest tire manufacturer in the company's worldwide operation. On July 1, 1963, the company celebrated the production of 100 million tires in Memphis. The Memphis plant closed in 1982, and most of the plant buildings were demolished.  The US Environmental Protection Agency considers the tract a brownfield site, and the possible presence of  hazardous substances or contaminants have deterred its redevelopment.

On October 11, 1941, a fire at the Firestone Rubber and Latex plant in Fall River, MA destroyed 5 out of its 8 buildings and destroyed at least 15,000 tons of rubber. The fire caused $12 million in damage (equivalent to $ in ).

During World War II, the company was called on by the U.S. Government to make artillery shells, aluminum kegs for food transport, and rubberized military products. Barrage balloons were produced at Akron. Firestone ranked 55th among U.S. corporations in the value of wartime military production contracts.  In the 1940s, Firestone was given a defense contract to produce plastic helmet liners; while outproduced by Westinghouse Electric, they still made a fair amount for the M1 Helmet.

In 1951, Firestone was given the defense contract for the MGM-5 Corporal missile. Firestone was given a total of US$6,888,796 (equivalent to $ in ) for the first 200 units. It was later modified to be able to carry a nuclear payload for use in the event of Cold War hostilities in Eastern Europe. Built in southern California, this missile was replaced in 1962 by the MGM-29 Sergeant system.

In 1961, Firestone acquired the Dayton Tire division from the Dayco Corporation. Dayco later sued both Firestone and Goodyear, alleging that the two companies conspired to monopolize the tire industry in the United States. The United States District Court dismissed the lawsuit.

In 1965 Firestone acquired the Seiberling Rubber Company.

Restructuring and sale to Bridgestone

In late 1979, Firestone brought in John Nevin, the ex-head of Zenith Electronics, as president to save the hemorrhaging company from total collapse. It was more than a billion dollars in debt at the time and losing $250 million a year (equivalent respectively to $ and $ in ).  Nevin closed nine of the company's seventeen manufacturing plants, including six in one day, and relocated the company from its ancestral home in Akron to  He spun off non-tire related businesses, including the Firestone Country Club; it was considered a deliberate plan to boost the stock price, and it paid off.

In 1988, after discussions with Pirelli, Nevin negotiated the sale of the company to the Japanese company Bridgestone, which was able to buy the company for much less than it had been worth a decade and a half earlier. The companies celebrated the 20th anniversary of the merger in 2008, and changed the name of the tire division to Bridgestone Americas Tire Operations, LLC. In 2012, Bridgestone Americas opened a $100 million (equivalent to $ in ) technical center in Akron.

Apart from tires, several companies and divisions operate with the Firestone brand in its name. These companies include Firestone Building Products, LLC, Firestone Industrial Products, LLC, Firestone Complete Auto Care, Firestone Natural Rubber Company, and Firestone Specialty Products.  Firestone Building Products and Firestone Industrial Products are headquartered in Indianapolis and operate in 23 U.S. states and ten countries, with 11,000 employees worldwide; its annual sales exceed $2.5 billion.

In 1972, Firestone received a ten-year import "concession" by the Kenyan government to secure Firestone's investment in a domestic tire plant, which gave it a virtual monopoly. This included both general price and foreign exchange controls. When the 10-year period came to an end in 1979, Firestone retaliated by increasing production, making entry less attractive. Headquarters eventually canceled expansion and failed negotiations led to no further investments.

Bridgestone Americas, which has served as the American branch of Japan-based Bridgestone since 1992, moved their corporate office to downtown Nashville in October 2017.

Firestone Complete Auto Care

Firestone Complete Auto Care is an American chain of automotive maintenance shops founded in Tennessee, United States, in 1926. It is owned by Firestone.

Overview 
There are over 1,700 Complete Auto Care locations in the United States, all of them independently owned by Firestone, with about 20 million customers each year as of 2002. At the start of 2022 Bridgestone, parent company of Firestone, announced that it will expand its hybrid and electric vehicular services

In motorsport
The Indianapolis 500 auto race was won in 1911 by a car running Firestone tires, as did all winners of the race from 1920 to 1966. The company also provided tires to NASCAR from 1948 to 1974, and to Formula One from 1950 to 1974. Citing rising costs as the cause, Firestone announced its withdrawal from professional motorsport in August 1974 with the exception of Formula 5000 and Formula One. Shortly afterward, Firestone extended this to a complete withdrawal by the end of the 1974 season. The manufacturer returned in 1995 to the CART series with technical assistance from Bridgestone. Goodyear retired after 1999, thereby leaving Firestone as the single tire supplier for the IndyCar Series as of 2021.

Corporate troubles

Great American streetcar scandal
In 1950, Firestone along with General Motors and Standard Oil, were charged and convicted of criminal conspiracy for their part in the Great American streetcar scandal. The scandal included purchasing streetcar systems throughout the United States and dismantling and replacing them with buses.

Firestone 500 tread separation problem 

Radial tires were introduced to the U.S. market by rivals Goodrich and Michelin in the late 1960s, and Firestone lacked their own radial tire. The first radial tire developed and produced by Firestone was the ill-fated Firestone 500 radial. Manufacturing of the new tire was performed on equipment designed to manufacture bias-ply tires.

During the 1970s, Firestone experienced major problems with the Firestone 500 radial. The Firestone 500 steel-belted radials began to show signs of separation of the tread at high speeds. While the cause was never proved, it is believed that the failure of bonding cements, used by Firestone to hold the tread to the tire carcass, may have allowed water to penetrate the tire, which in turn may have caused the internal steel wire to corrode. In March 1978, the U.S. National Highway Traffic Safety Administration (NHTSA) announced publicly a formal investigation into defects of the Firestone 500. The NHTSA investigation found that the tread separation problem was most probably a design defect affecting all Firestone 500s.

In 1973, only two years after the 500's debut, Thomas A. Robertson, Firestone's director of development wrote an internal memo stating "We are making an inferior quality radial tire which will subject us to belt-edge separation at high mileage". Firestone introduced strict quality control measures in an attempt to fix the inherent problems, however they were not successful in eliminating the basic faults. In 1977 a recall of 400,000 tires produced at the problematic Decatur plant was initiated. Firestone blamed the problems on the consumer, stating underinflation and poor maintenance.

On October 20, 1978, Firestone recalled over 7 million Firestone 500 tires, the largest tire recall to date. Congressional hearings into the 500 also took place in 1978. The tire was found to be defective and the cause of 250 deaths. In May 1980 after finding that they knew the tires were defective, the NHTSA fined Firestone $500,000 (equivalent to $ in ), which at that time was the largest fine imposed on any U.S. corporation and the largest civil penalty imposed since passage of the 1966 National Traffic and Motor Vehicle Act. Multiple lawsuits were settled out of court and the constant negative publicity crippled the company's sales and share price.

Harvard Business School and Wharton School of the University of Pennsylvania taught classes and wrote papers on the issues of misjudgments and poor decision-making by the management of Firestone. After years of bad publicity and millions paid out in compensation to victims, Firestone was losing vast amounts of money, and its name was severely damaged.

Liberian rubber plantation 

Firestone established the Firestone Natural Rubber plantation in Harbel, Liberia in 1926. From 1926 until the outbreak of the First Liberian Civil War in 1990, the Firestone Natural Rubber Company was the largest plantation of its kind in the world. It was originally envisioned for 350,000 people to be employed on the newly created plantations. However this was more than the number of able-bodied men in the entire nation at the time, which created intense pressure for labor. In the period between 1926 and 1946 Christine Whyte concluded that: The collusion between Firestone and government officials to keep wages low and coerce workers onto the plantations was at best substantially overlooked, at worst regarded as a form of "development" in itself.

In September 1990, rebel NPFL forces (led by Charles Taylor, who would later be convicted of war crimes) executed sitting Liberian president Samuel Doe and seized the Harbel plantation. Firestone had to evacuate its American workers as a result. In June 1991, Firestone sent a delegation to Monrovia in an attempt to restart operations in Harbel. After a month of waiting, the delegation was brought to meet Taylor, and after a further six months of negotiations the company signed a Memorandum of Understanding (MOU) with the National Patriotic Reconstruction Assembly Government's Ministry of Finance in January 1992. This MOU provided for taxes to be paid by Firestone to the Taylor government, and for the Taylor government to provide protection to Firestone's employees and assets in Liberia. Firestone resumed operations in March 1992, but once again had to halt in October that same year as hostilities escalated. Over this period, the company had paid $2.3 million in taxes to the Taylor government (equivalent to $ in ), which some say helped legitimize Taylor's Greater Liberia government and finance and enable its attack on ECOMOG controlled Monrovia. Operations did not fully restart until 2003 at the conclusion of the Second Liberian Civil War. Since the end of the war, Firestone has invested over $100 million in restoring and rebuilding its facilities in Liberia.

The company's ventures in Liberia have been the subject of considerable scrutiny and criticism, including a 2005 Alien Tort Claims Act case brought in California by the International Labor Rights Fund and a 2014 investigative report by ProPublica entitled "Firestone and the Warlord", and a PBS Frontline documentary by the same name.

Ford Explorer rollover problem 

In 1996, several state agencies in Arizona began experiencing major issues with Firestone tires on Explorers. According to news reports, various agencies demanded new tires, and Firestone conducted an investigation of the complaints, tested the tires and tried to assert that the tires had been abused or under-inflated.

On September 6, 2000, in a statement before the U.S. Senate Appropriations Transportation subcommittee the president of the consumer advocacy group Public Citizen, Joan Claybrook, stated:

The report went on to indicate that Ford also had been complicit, stating that The Ford Motor Company had instructed Firestone to add a nylon ply to the tires it manufactured in Venezuela for additional strength and that Ford had made suspension changes to the Explorer model available in Venezuela. Ford did not specify adding the nylon ply for U.S.-made Firestone tires nor did it change the Explorer suspension on U.S. models at this time.

An abnormally high failure rate in Firestone's Wilderness AT, Firestone ATX, and ATX II tires resulted in multiple lawsuits, as well as an eventual mandatory recall. In 2001 Bridgestone/Firestone severed its ties to Ford citing a lack of trust. The lack of trust stemmed from concerns that Ford had not heeded warnings by Bridgestone/Firestone relating to the design of the Ford Explorer.  In 2006, Firestone announced renewed efforts to recall tires of the same model recalled in 2000 after the tires were linked to recent deaths and injuries. According to Firestone's last filing with the National Highway Transportation Administration, only 90,259 of more than 2.5 million recalled tires were confirmed as removed from service.  In November 2013, two recalled Wilderness AT tires were found in Atlanta, Georgia. One of the tires was offered for sale as new at a used tire retail shop.

Some outside observers have speculated about the blame worthiness of both parties. Firestone's tires being prone to tread separation and failure, and the SUVs being especially prone to rolling over if a tire fails at speed compared to other vehicles. A subsequent NHTSA investigation of real world accident data showed that the Ford Explorer SUVs in question were no more likely to roll over after a tread separation than any other SUV.

Labour economists Alan Krueger and Alexandre Mas concluded that one of the main reasons for the high defect rate of Firestone tires was linked to a dispute between the unions and Firestone at the Decatur plant 1994–1996. They find that the tires manufactured at the plant in question around this time featured substantially increased defect rates, rising with the onset of the dispute and subsiding when the dispute was finally settled at the end of 1996. Other similar plants of Firestone did not report similar increases in the defect rate in this period.

Television advertisement jingle

Where the Rubber Meets the Road is an advertisement jingle that was frequently used in the 1960s and 1970s, especially on televised sporting events.
The jingle was sung by Don Rondo.

Wherever wheels are turning,
No matter what the load,
The name that's known is Firestone
Where the rubber meets the road

Other brands

Bridgestone/Firestone also produces tires under the Fuzion brand name. Fuzion is a tire manufactured in China for Bridgestone/ Firestone as a budget replacement tire.

Makes include the Fuzion UHP Sport A/S, SUV, and Touring.

See also
Bridgestone
Firestone-Apsley Rubber Company
Formula One tires 
Tom Gegax
IndyCar Series

References

Further reading
 Firestone, Harvey Samuel, and Samuel Crowther. Men and rubber: The story of business (Doubleday, Page, 1926) online
 Knoll, Arthur J. "Harvey S. Firestone's Liberian Investment (1922-1932)." Liberian Studies Journal 14.1 (1989): 13–33. online
 Skrabec Jr, Quentin R. Rubber: An American Industrial History (McFarland, 2013).

External links

Century of Progress from the Summit Memory Project

1900 establishments in Ohio
1988 mergers and acquisitions
American brands
American companies established in 1900
American subsidiaries of foreign companies
Automotive companies established in 1900
Automotive companies of the United States
Bridgestone
Companies based in Akron, Ohio
Formula One tyre suppliers
Manufacturing companies based in Nashville, Tennessee
Tire manufacturers of the United States
U.S. Synthetic Rubber Program